Mark Dickson may refer to:

Mark Dickson (footballer) (born 1981), Northern Irish football (soccer) player
Mark Dickson (tennis) (born 1959), professional tour tennis player of the 1980s and from the United States
Mark Lee Dickson (anti-abortion advocate)

See also
Mark Dixon (disambiguation)